GAAP or Gaap may refer to:

Accounting
 Generally accepted accounting principles, a standard framework of guidelines for financial accounting
 Generally Accepted Accounting Principles (Canada)
 Generally Accepted Accounting Practice (UK)
 Generally Accepted Accounting Principles (United States)
 French generally accepted accounting principles
 Russian GAAP

Other uses
 Golgi anti-apoptotic protein
 Gaap, a goetic demon
 Gruppi Anarchici d'Azione Proletaria, an anarchist grouping in 1950s Italy